The Anglican Church of St George in Easton in Gordano in the English county of Somerset is a Grade II* listed building.

History
The church is dedicated to St. George.

The date of the first Church on this site is unknown, but records exist dating back to 1239.  It is known that a church stood on the current site since 1230, but was rebuilt in the 14th and 15th centuries. The registers date from 1559.

The church was rebuilt, with the exception of the tower, in 1872 by Ewan Christian. Conservation work was carried out on the tower in 2011. In 2015 a grant was received to help towards the cost of the repair of the church roof.

The parish is part of the benefice of Pill, Portbury and Easton in Gordano within the Diocese of Bath and Wells.

Architecture

The church has north and south aisles, a nave with clerestory, vestry and chancel. The 14th century three-stage west tower is supported by set-back buttresses.

See also
 List of ecclesiastical parishes in the Diocese of Bath and Wells

References

Grade II* listed buildings in North Somerset
Grade II* listed churches in Somerset